Benevides Juan Ramirez was a Spanish painter of the late-Baroque period. He learned drawing from his brother Josef, a sculptor. In 1753, his picture of the Election of King Pelayo, gained him election as a supernumerary professor in the Royal Academy of San Fernando After studying under Corrado Giaquinto he neglected painting for music, and died at Zaragoza in 1782.

References

1782 deaths
Artists from Madrid
18th-century Spanish painters
18th-century Spanish male artists
Spanish male painters
Spanish Baroque painters
Year of birth unknown